

This is a list of the National Register of Historic Places listings in Maury County, Tennessee.

This is intended to be a complete list of the properties and districts on the National Register of Historic Places in Maury County, Tennessee, United States. Latitude and longitude coordinates are provided for many National Register properties and districts; these locations may be seen together in a map.

There are 68 properties and districts listed on the National Register in the county, including 2 National Historic Landmarks.  There are two former listings.

Current listings

|}

Former listings

|}

See also

 List of National Historic Landmarks in Tennessee
 National Register of Historic Places listings in Tennessee

References

Maury
Maury County, Tennessee
Buildings and structures in Maury County, Tennessee